Rat Rock is an uninhabited,  tall rock island in the San Francisco Bay, located just north of China Camp. It serves to protect part of the beach at China Camp from winds which come from the northwest. It appears on a 2015 United States Geological Survey map of the area.

References 

Uninhabited islands of California
Islands of Marin County, California
Islands of San Francisco Bay
Islands of Northern California